Vulić is a Serbo-Croatian surname, a patronymic derived from Vule, a diminutive of Vuk. It may refer to:

Bojana Vulić (born 1984), Serbian basketball player
Ivan Vulić (born 1956), Croatian architect
Kazimir Vulić (born 1967), Croatian footballer
Lejla Vulić (born 2002), Montenegrin-American singer
Miloš Vulić (born 1996), Serbian footballer
Zoran Vulić (born 1961), Croatian footballer and manager

See also
Vulin, surname

Croatian surnames
Serbian surnames